Revine Lago is a comune (municipality) in the Province of Treviso in the Italian region Veneto, located about  north of Venice and about  north of Treviso.

The municipality of Revine Lago contains the frazioni (subdivisions, mainly villages and hamlets) Revine, Lago, and Santa Maria (Sede Municipale).

Revine Lago borders the following municipalities: Cison di Valmarino, Limana, Tarzo, Trichiana, Vittorio Veneto.

Geography and climate
The municipality is dividend in two main areas: the Prealpi side and the valley. 
The Prealpi side is a slope almost completely covered by wood. Two lakes are situated in the valley: lake of Santa Maria, and lake of Lago. The majority of the buildings are situated between the slope and the lakes.

Demographic evolution

Twin towns
Revine Lago is twinned with:

  Mitterdorf an der Raab, Austria

References

Cities and towns in Veneto